The Journal of Architectural Engineering is a quarterly peer-reviewed scientific journal published by the American Society of Civil Engineers covering all aspects of engineering design, planning, construction, and operation of buildings, including building systems; structural, mechanical, and electrical engineering; acoustics; environmental quality; lighting; and sustainability.

Abstracting and indexing
The journal is indexed in Ei Compendex, Emerging Sources Citation Index, ProQuest databases, Civil Engineering Database, Inspec, Scopus, and EBSCO databases.

References

External links

Civil engineering journals
American Society of Civil Engineers academic journals
Publications established in 1995
Architecture journals
English-language journals